Lustrum (US: Conspirata; 2009) is a historical novel by British author Robert Harris. It is the sequel to Imperium and the middle volume of a trilogy about the life of Cicero (106–43 BC). For its 2010 release in the United States and Italy, it was retitled Conspirata.

The book continues in the format of the first novel, with the story told in the first-person from the point of view of Cicero's secretary Tiro. It follows on immediately from Imperium, starting with the beginning of Cicero's consulship and ending with his exile as a result of the enmity of Clodius.

The novel was shortlisted for the 2010 Walter Scott Prize. It and the other novels in the trilogy were also adapted for the stage in 2017 by Mike Poulton.

References

External links
 

2009 British novels
Cultural depictions of Cicero
British historical novels
Novels by Robert Harris
Novels set in ancient Rome
Hutchinson (publisher) books
Novels set in the 1st century BC
British novels adapted into plays
Cultural depictions of Catiline
Cultural depictions of Pompeia (wife of Caesar)